The 433rd Weapons Squadron is a United States Air Force unit, assigned to the USAF Weapons School at Nellis AFB, Nevada.

The unit was first activated in May 1943 and flew the P-38 Lightning in the Pacific Theater of Operations. The 433rd distinguished themselves in air combat against Japan over New Guinea, Rabaul, and the Philippines, achieving over 200 aerial victories. Reactivated in 1964 for the war in Southeast Asia, the 433rd was assigned to the 8th Fighter Wing at Ubon, Thailand, flying the F-4 Phantom II. The 433rd was credited with 12 MiG kills over North Vietnam.

History

World War II
Established by Fifth Air Force in Australia in May 1943 specifically to accommodate very long range Lockheed P-38J Lightnings at Amberley Airfield in Queensland, Australia. The 433rd was specifically trained to provide long-range escort for bombers during daylight raids on Japanese airfields and strongholds in the Netherlands East Indies and the Bismarck Archipelago.

Engaged in combat operations, providing escort for B-25 Mitchell medium bombers that were engaged in strafing attacks on airdromes at Wewak but also destroyed a number of the enemy fighter planes that attacked the formation.  Also intercepted and destroyed many Japanese aircraft which were sent against American shipping in Oro Bay on 15 and 17 October 1943. Covered landings in New Guinea, New Britain, and the Schouten Islands. After moving to Biak in July 1944, the squadron flew escort missions and fighter sweeps to the southern Philippines, Celebes, Halmahera, and Borneo.

Moved to the Philippines in October 1944 and attacked enemy airfields and installations, escorting bombers, and engaging in aerial combat during the first stages of the Allied campaign to recover the Philippines, October–December 1944.  The squadron flew many missions to support ground forces on Luzon during the first part of 1945. Also flew escort missions to Southeast China and attacked railways on Formosa. Began moving to Ie Shima near Okinawa in August 1945  but the war ended before the movement was completed.

After active combat ended, on 22 September 1945, the squadron moved to Seoul Airfield, Korea for occupation duty as part of the 308th Bomb Wing, assigned to the 315th Air Division of Far East Air Forces. The unit moved to Kimpo Airfield, on 7 January 1946 where it converted to the very long-range P-51H Mustang. The squadron was reassigned to Nagoya Airfield, Japan in March 1947 and later moved to Itazuke Airfield, Japan in August 1948. It became a subordinate unit of 475th Fighter Wing on 10 August.

The squadron was inactivated on 1 April 1949 at Itazuke Airfield, Japan

Cold War

Reactivated by Air Defense Command in 1952 as a Fighter-Interceptor Squadron, stationed at Truax Field, Wisconsin and equipped with F-89 Scorpions.  Deployed to Eleventh Air Force at Ladd AFB, Alaska, 1954 performing air defense of central and Northern Alaska, responding to GCI directed intercepts of intruding Soviet aircraft.  Returned to the Continental United States, being assigned to Minot AFB, North Dakota in 1957. However, no aircraft were assigned to the unit, and in January 1958 the 433rd FIS was inactivated due to budget restraints.

Was reassigned to Tactical Air Command, being stationed at George AFB, California, assigned to 8th Tactical Fighter Wing.   Equipped with F-4C Phantom II tactical fighter-bomber, engaged in training, participated in numerous exercises, operational readiness inspections, deployments.

Vietnam War

Was deployed to Ubon Royal Thai Air Force Base in December 1965, becoming part of Pacific Air Forces Thirteenth Air Force. Assigned to the 8th Tactical Fighter Wing, engaged in combat operations over Southeast Asia, the squadron's mission included bombardment, ground support, air defense, interdiction, and armed reconnaissance.

Beginning in May 1967, it was re-equipped with new F-4D aircraft. This gave the unit the distinction of being the first in Southeast Asia to be operationally equipped with improved Phantom II. In May 1968, the squadron began combat-testing the first laser-guided bombs (LGBs), the BOLT-117 and the Paveway.

During its final years of combat, used F-4Ds for fast-forward air control, interdiction, escort, armed reconnaissance, and other special missions.   Continued combat in Vietnam until mid-January 1973, in Laos until 22 February 1973, and in Cambodia until 15 August 1973.    Remained in Thailand until July 1974 when the squadron was inactivated.

Fighter Weapons Squadron
Reactivated as part of the 57th Fighter Weapons Wing at Nellis AFB, Nevada on 1 October 1976.  Mission of the squadron was test and evaluate systems modifications to the McDonnell Douglas F-15A Eagle prior to those changes being released to operational units of  Tactical Air Command and USAFE.   Mission assumed by USAF Fighter Weapons School F-15 Division at the end of 1981, inactivated on 30 December.

Flying Training
Reactivated in 1983 at Holloman AFB, New Mexico as a T-38 Talon training squadron to provide Lead-In Fighter Training (LIFT) training for pilots assigned to fly the F-15 Eagle.   Performed training on the T-38 until the LIFT program was sharply cut back in 1991, as part of the end of the Cold War.  Inactivated 8 July 1992.

USAF Weapons School

Reactivated at Nellis AFB in 2003, replacing the USAF Fighter Weapons School F-15C Division. Mission was conduct Weapons Instructors Course at the USAF Weapons School and provide the world's most advanced training in weapons and tactics employment.  Upon completing the course, graduates return to their home stations, taking the latest tactics, techniques and procedures for air-to-air and air-to-ground combat to their respective units.    During the course, students receive an average of 400 hours of graduate-level academics and participate in demanding combat training missions. The climax of the course is the mission employment phase, a two-week staged battle over the Nevada Test and Training Range.

Began teaching F-15 course in Feb 2003. Began instruction with F-22 Raptor, providing a Weapons Instructor Course in 2009. The F-15C Eagles were officially retired shortly following WSINT 21B in December of 2021.

Lineage

 Activated on 14 May 1943 by special authority prior to constitution as 433 Fighter Squadron (Two Engine) on 15 May 1943
 Redesignated 433 Fighter Squadron, Two Engine on 14 Feb 1944
 Redesignated 433 Fighter Squadron, Single Engine on 8 Jan 1946
 Inactivated on 1 Apr 1949
 Redesignated 433 Fighter-Interceptor Squadron on 11 Sep 1952
 Activated on 1 Nov 1952
 Inactivated on 8 Jan 1958
 Redesignated 433 Tactical Fighter Squadron, and activated, on 16 Jul 1964.
 Organized on 25 Jul 1964
 Inactivated on 23 Jul 1974
 Redesignated 433 Fighter Weapons Squadron on 10 May 1976
 Activated on 1 Oct 1976
 Inactivated on 30 Dec 1981, assets re=designated as the USAF Fighter Weapons School F-15C Division.
 Redesignated 433 Tactical Fighter Training Squadron on 25 May 1983
 Activated on 1 Sep 1983
 Redesignated 433 Fighter Squadron on 1 Nov 1991
 Inactivated on 8 Jul 1992
 Redesignated 433 Weapons Squadron on 24 Jan 2003
 Activated and organized on 3 February 2003, assuming resources of F-15C Division, USAF Weapons School

Assignments
 475th Fighter Group, 14 May 1943 – 1 Apr 1949
 Attached to 347th Fighter Group, 18 Nov 1947 – 28 Aug 1948
 31st Air Division, 1 Nov 1952
 520th Air Defense Group, 16 Feb 1953
 11th Air Division, 14 Jul 1954
 5001st Air Defense Group, 20 Sep 1954
 11th Air Division, 1 Oct 1955
 32d Fighter Group, 1 Nov 1957 – 8 Jan 1958
 Tactical Air Command, 16 Jul 1964
 8th Tactical Fighter Wing, 25 Jul 1964 – 23 Jul 1974
 57th Fighter Weapons (later, 57th Tactical Training; 57th Fighter Weapons) Wing, 1 Oct 1976 – 30 Dec 1981
 479th Tactical Training Wing, 1 Sep 1983
 479th Fighter Group, 26 Jul 1991
 49th Operations Group, 15 Nov 1991 – 8 Jul 1992
 USAF Weapons School, 3 Feb 2003 – present

Stations

 Charters Towers, Australia, 14 May 1943
 RAAF Base Amberley, Australia, c. 1 July 1943
 Dobodura Airfield Complex, New Guinea, 14 August 1943
 Operated from Port Moresby Airfield Complex, New Guinea, 8 August-3 October 1943
 Nadzab Airfield Complex, New Guinea, 26 March 1944
 Hollandia Airfield Complex, New Guinea, 15 May 1944
 Mokmer Airfield, Biak, Netherlands East Indies, 15 July 1944
 Dulag Airfield, Leyte, 9 November 1944
 Detachment operated from McGuire Field, San Jose, Mindoro, 5 February—c. 4 March 1945
 Clark Field, Luzon, 28 February 1945

 Lingayen Airfield, Luzon, 19 April 1945
 Ie Shima Airfield, Okinawa, 8 August 1945
 Kimpo AB, Korea, 5 October 1945
 Titami, Japan, 21 September 1946
 Itazuke AB, Japan, 18 November 1947 – 1 April 1949
 Truax Field, Wisconsin, 1 November 1952
 Ladd AFB, Alaska, 16 July 1954
 Minot AFB, North Dakota, 1 November 1957 – 8 January 1958.
 George AFB, CA, 25 Jul 1964-Dec 1965
 Ubon RTAFB, Thailand, 8 Dec 1965 – 23 Jul 1974
 Nellis AFB, NV, 1 Oct 1976 – 30 Dec 1981
 Holloman AFB, NM, 1 Sep 1983 – 8 Jul 1992
 Nellis AFB, NV, 3 Feb 2003 – present

Aircraft

 P-38 Lightning, 1943–1946
 P-51 Mustang, 1946–1949
 F-94C Starfire, 1953
 F-89C Scorpion, 1952–1957
 F-4C Phantom II, 1964–1967

 F-4D Phantom II, 1967–1974
 F-15A/B Eagle, 1976–1981
 T-38 Talon, 1983–1992
 F-15C Eagle, 2003 – 2021
 F-22 Raptor, 2004 – present

References

Notes
 Explanatory notes

 Citations

Bibliography

 
 
 
 
 

Fighter Weapons 0433